Raphaëlle Tervel (born 21 April 1979) is a former French handballer and current assistant coach of Győri ETO KC. She was born in Besançon.

She made her debut with the national team in 1998. She won gold medals with the French team at the 2003 World Women's Handball Championship in Croatia.  She competed at the Summer Olympics in 2000, 2004, 2008 and 2012.

Raphaëlle won the EHF Women's Champions League with Győri Audi ETO KC in 2013 and 2014 then she retired.

She returned to handball court in 2022 as a player-coach at Győri Audi ETO KC, after a lot of injuries in the team.

References

External links

French female handball players
Handball players at the 2000 Summer Olympics
Handball players at the 2004 Summer Olympics
Handball players at the 2008 Summer Olympics
Handball players at the 2012 Summer Olympics
Olympic handball players of France
Expatriate handball players
Living people
Sportspeople from Besançon
1979 births
French expatriate sportspeople in Spain
French expatriate sportspeople in Hungary
Győri Audi ETO KC players